Garfield Delano Spence (born 11 January 1985), also known as Konshens, is a Jamaican dancehall recording artist.

Biography
Garfield Delano Spence was born on 11 January 1985. Prior to his solo career, he was a member of the duo SoJah with his brother Delus. His hits have included "Winner", "Rasta Impostor", "This Means Money", "Good Girl Gone Bad", "Gal Dem A Talk", "Realest Song", "Represent", "Do Sumn" and "Forward", "Gal a bubble".

His 2005 single "Pon Di Corner" was a major hit in Japan, and led to a month-long tour of the country and a Japan-only album release.

He made a guest appearance on Tarrus Riley's Contagious album, deejaying on "Good Girl Gone Bad", which was also released as a single.

He has a large fanbase in Kenya, Trinidad and Tobago, Guyana and Europe, where his "Gal Dem Talk" single was a major hit, and he performed at Guyana's National Stadium in May 2011.

His album, Real Talk, was released by Japanese label Koyashi in 2010. A second album was also announced to be released in Jamaica on Tad Dawkins' Tad's International label. Konshens also launched his own Subkonshus label in 2010, working with new acts including his brother Delus.

In May 2011, he was one of several high-profile Jamaican celebrities to take part in a march in Torrington Park calling for an end to political rivalry in the area, commemorating a fire in May 1980 at the Eventide Home which killed over 150 elderly women, for which politically motivated arson was suspected.

In 2012, he released his second album, Mental Maintenance.

In March 2014, he became an official brand ambassador for Pepsi.

In July 2018, he was featured on I Don't Dance (Without You) with Matoma and Enrique Iglesias.

Personal life
Spence married Latoya Wright in Miami, Florida, in November 2017. Spence has two children, Liam and Sajhi Spence

Discography

Albums

Studio albums
 Real Talk (2010) (Japan only)
 Mental Maintenance (2012)
 Road Album (2014)
 It Feel Good (2018)
 RAW (2018)
 Badman vs Nice Guy (2019)
 Soca Virgin (2020)
 Red Reign (2021)

Collaborative albums
 "Medi" (featuring Delus) Intouch Riddim (with Various Artists) (2008)

Singles

As lead artist
"Pon Di Corner" (featuring Delus) (2005) 
"Rasta Imposter"
"This Means Money"
"Winner" (2008)
"Realest Song" (2010)
"No retreat"(2010)
"Gal Dem A Talk" (2010)
"Realest Medz" (2010)
"Weak" (reggae) (2010)
"Represent" (2011)
"Forward" (2011)
"Buss A Blank" (2011)
"Touch Back Again" (2011)
"Bounce Like A Ball" (2011)
"Jamaican Dance" (2011)
"Bad Gyal" (2011)
"Gal A Bubble" (2012)
"Do Sum'n" (2012)
"Shat A Fyah" (2012)
"Stop Sign" (2012)
"Touch Regular" (2012)
"Gyal Sidung" (2012)
"So Mi Tan" (2012)
"On Your Face" (2012)
"Mad Mi" (2012)
"I'm Coming" (2012) 
"Jiggle" (2013)
"Couple Up" (2013)
"U Better Miss Me" (2013)
 "Walk And Wine" (2013)
"Give Praise" (2013)
"Depend on You" (2013)
"Tan Up An Wuk" (2013)
"Weak" (2013)
"Show Yourself" (2013)
"Pull Up To Mi Bumper" (& J Capri) (2013)
"We A Hustle" (2013)
"Sekkle Dung" (featuring Raine Seville) (2013)
"Turbo Wine" (featuring Rickman) (2013)
"We No Worry Bout Them" (featuring Romain Virgo) (2013)
"To Her with Love" (2013)
"Weed on Me" (2014)
"Forever Young" (2014)
"Independent Girl" (2014)
"Money" (featuring Masicka) (2014)
"Come Get This" (2014)
"Touch You" (2014)
"Duppy Dem" (2014)
"Don Daddy" (2014)
"Bruk Off" (2016)
"Turn Me On" (2017)

As featured artist
"Feel So Right" (Imposs featuring Konshens)
"Good Girl Gone Bad" (Tarrus Riley featuring Konshens)
"Feels Right" (Pleasure P featuring Konshens) (2014)
"Want Dem All" (Sean Paul featuring Konshens) (2014)
"Policeman" (Eva Simons featuring Konshens) (2015)
"No Friend Zone" (Mink Jo featuring Konshens) (2016)
"Can't Wait" (Kreesha Turner featuring Konshens) (2016)
"Don't Let Me Down" (The Chainsmokers featuring Daya and Konshens) (Dom Da Bomb & Electric Bodega Remix) (2016)
"Tropical Limelight" (Tha Hot$hot and Stekaly featuring Konshens) (2014)
"Back It Up" (Cardi B featuring Konshens and Hoodcelebrityy) (2017)
"Oh God" (Era Istrefi featuring Konshens) (2018)
"I Don't Dance (Without You)" (Matoma with Enrique Iglesias featuring Konshens) (2018)
"Wine Pon You" (Doja Cat featuring Konshens) (2018)
"Reload" (Eve featuring Konshens) (2019)
"Make A Move" (DJ Katch feat. Konshens & BAMMBI) (2019)
"Voodoo" (Mr. Mauricio feat. Pitbull, Jencarlos & Konshens) (2020)

References

1985 births
Living people
Musicians from Kingston, Jamaica
Jamaican dancehall musicians
21st-century Jamaican musicians
21st-century male musicians
Jamaican male musicians